Piazza Maggiore (Piâza Mażåur in the Bolognese language) is a central square in Bologna, region of Emilia-Romagna, Italy. The appearance in the 21st century, generally reflects the layout from the 15th century. The Northwest corner opens into Piazza del Nettuno with its Fontana del Nettuno, while the Northeast corner opens into the narrower Piazza Re Enzo, running along the flanks of the Palazzo Re Enzo that merges with the Palazzo del Podestà. Flanking the Piazza del Nettuno is the Biblioteca Salaborsa.

Layout

The square is surrounded by major administrative and religious buildings in the history of Bologna, including:
Palazzo d'Accursio (W) - former city hall, now museum
Palazzo dei Notai (SW) - former notaries' guild
Basilica of San Petronio (SE) - Duomo of Bologna
Palazzo dei Banchi (E)- former banking center
Palazzo del Podestà, Bologna (N) - former police and justice offices

Maggiore
Monuments and historic places of Bologna